Yat Tung Estate North is one of the 10 constituencies in the Islands District in Hong Kong. The constituency returns one district councillor to the Islands District Council, with an election every four years.

Yat Tung Estate North constituency is loosely based on northern part of the Yat Tung Estate in Tung Chung with an estimated population of 24,772.

Councillors represented

Election results

2010s

2000s

References

Tung Chung
Constituencies of Hong Kong
Constituencies of Islands District Council
2007 establishments in Hong Kong
Constituencies established in 2007